Sea Life Bangkok Ocean World (formerly, Siam Ocean World) is an aquarium in Bangkok, Thailand and is the largest in South East Asia.

The Sea Life Bangkok Ocean World aims to provide both entertainment and education to visitors. Through formal educational programs, the aquarium aims to promote an appreciation and understanding of the aquatic environment in line with the formal Thailand curriculum.

This venue practices dual pricing, where Thai nationals and expat citizens pay around half the price that foreigners do.

Inside Ocean World
Animals that can be found at the aquarium include: Japanese spider crabs, giant pacific octopus, shark rays, african penguins, starfish, seahorses, frogs, and jellyfish.

Oceanus Australia Group
The Oceanus Group was established 1993. Oceanus Australia Pty Ltd was the World's largest aquarium owner and operator (by numbers of customers and volume of displays). The Group owned aquariums in Melbourne, Mooloolaba, Busan (South Korea) and manages the Ocean World Aquarium in Shanghai.

Oceanus Group was acquired in 2011 by Merlin Entertainments, the world's second largest attraction operator including Legoland and Madame Tussauds.

References

External links

Aquaria in Thailand
Tourist attractions in Bangkok
Buildings and structures in Bangkok
Sea Life Centres
Merlin Entertainments Group
2005 establishments in Thailand